Sliver of a Sun is the debut album by IZZ, released in 1998. The tracks range from the progressive rock styles of groups such as Emerson, Lake & Palmer, Genesis, Yes, and King Crimson to Beatles-esque pop to ambient. One interesting aspect of the band is its use of two drummers on most tracks.

The title of the album appears in the lyrics of the song "Razor."

Track listing
"Endless Calling" – 5:07
"I Get Lost" – 4:41
"Lornadoone" – 4:13
"She Walked Out the Door" – 2:59
"Assurance" – 9:02
"Take It Higher" – 3:13
"Double Bass" – 2:23
"Just a Girl" – 4:16
"Meteor" – 5:20
"Razor" – 7:00
"Where I Belong" – 10:19

Personnel
Tom Galgano - vocals, piano, synthesizers, acoustic and electric guitars
John Galgano - electric and acoustic guitars, electric bass, hollering
Brian Coralian - electronic and acoustic percussion, acoustic drumset, whooping, scream of fear
Greg DiMiceli - acoustic drumset and percussion, whooping
Philip Gaita - electric bass, acoustic and electric guitars, piccolo bass, fretless electric bass
Paul Bremner - nylon string and electric guitars
Michele Salustri - background vocals, admonishing
Danielle Altieri - lead and background vocals, flute, complaining

1998 debut albums
IZZ albums